Mike Bartlett (born January 6, 1985) is an American former professional ice hockey player who last played for Danish club, Frederikshavn White Hawks of the Metal Ligaen.

Career 
In the 2011–12 season, Bartlett played primarily in the American Hockey League with the Binghamton Senators, posting 7 points in 58 games. On August 5, 2012, Bartlett signed his first European contract on a one-year deal with Austrian club, HC Innsbruck of the EBEL. In the following season, Bartlett returned to Europe signing a contract after a successful try-out with the Frederikshavn White Hawks of Denmark.

Personal life
Bartlett is married to college softball head coach Megan Bartlett.

Career statistics

Regular season and playoffs

International

References

External links

1985 births
American men's ice hockey right wingers
Arizona Sundogs players
Austin Ice Bats players
Binghamton Senators players
Charlotte Checkers (1993–2010) players
Cincinnati Cyclones (ECHL) players
Frederikshavn White Hawks players
Gwinnett Gladiators players
Houston Aeros (1994–2013) players
HC TWK Innsbruck players
Johnstown Chiefs players
Lake Erie Monsters players
Living people
Milwaukee Admirals players
Notre Dame Fighting Irish men's ice hockey players
Ice hockey players from Illinois
USA Hockey National Team Development Program players